The two-coloured skink (Trachylepis dichroma) is a species of skink found in Kenya and Tanzania.

References

Trachylepis
Reptiles described in 2005
Taxa named by Rainer Günther
Taxa named by Alison S. Whiting
Taxa named by Aaron M. Bauer